Hi Honey, I'm Home! is an American television sitcom that ran from July 19, 1991, to July 12, 1992 for 13 episodes. Each week, a new episode of the series aired on ABC as part of its Friday night TGIF lineup. The same episode would re-air Sunday night on Nickelodeon as part of the channel's Nick at Nite lineup. ABC stopped airing the series after the sixth episode of the first season. The show's second and final season only aired on Nick at Nite before being canceled in July 1992. The series was taped before a live audience in Nickelodeon Studios at Universal Studios Florida.

Characters
Honey Nielsen (Charlotte Booker)An archetypal 1950s' sitcom housewife and mom. Her most commonly used catchphrase is "Oh, pooh!" whenever anything went wrong (although at the end of the original pilot, she said "Oh, hell!"). Elaine is her friend, although she doesn't understand the modern era, and she occasionally helps Elaine realize that there are still some times when simplicity works. Mike looks to her as a surrogate mother, since Elaine works full-time and goes to night school and isn't around a lot.
Lloyd Nielsen (Stephen C. Bradbury)The bumbling, clueless dad. He tends to think himself automatically right in any conflict because he is a man, but can't keep a job for any real length of time. He clashes with Elaine's liberalism. 
Babs Nielsen (Julie Benz)The Nielsens' pretty, popular, and airheaded teenage daughter.  Target of a crush by Mike Duff, which she doesn't reciprocate.
Chucky Nielsen (Danny Gura)The Nielsens' chubby and naive younger son. Is sometimes used as a pawn by the delinquent Skunk without him knowing it.
Elaine Duff (Susan Cella)Sarcastic next-door neighbor to the Nielsens and single mom to two sons. She considers Mike her pal and gets somewhat jealous that Honey monopolizes her son's time. Her ex-husband, the boys father, left her for another woman named Miranda after she worked to put him through college. Her hyper-liberalism is contrasted with Lloyd's conservative viewpoints and thus clashes with him at times. She works full-time and attends night school, so she is seldom home. She attempts to teach Honey about the realism of the 1990s while Honey sometimes helps Elaine to remember the compassion and simplicity that epitomized the 1950s.
Mike Duff (Peter Benson)Elaine Duff's television junkie teenage son, who knows the real identities of the Nielsens. The head of his family, due to his dad's absence, Elaine considers him her pal. He has a crush on Babs which isn't reciprocated. He, along with his mother, try to teach the Nielsens about life in the 1990s. Partially, due to his father's abandonment of him and the rest of the family, Mike sometimes looks to Honey as the mother he'd always wanted since Elaine is seldom home, due to her work and school schedule. Honey also helps Mike to realize that they are good friends and that despite his mom's overly busy schedule she does love him.
Sidney "Skunk" Duff (Eric Kushnick)Elaine's younger son, is a total delinquent and constant troublemaker who sometimes uses Chucky as a pawn. Elaine thinks he's a lost cause. He insults Mike as well. He also wants to live with his father, who would let him be as bad as he wanted.

The original unaired pilot featured two actors who were later recast. Actress Dee Hoty was originally cast as Elaine Duff, but was replaced by Susan Cella. Future Backstreet Boy A. J. McLean was originally cast as Sidney "Skunk" Duff and was replaced by Eric Kushnick. The pilot was then re-shot with the different actors and aired.

The original pilot eventually aired during Nickelodeon's "Nick Knew Them When" anniversary marathon on June 27, 1999, highlighting A.J. McLean's involvement in the program.

Episodes

Season 1 (1991)

* The original, unaired pilot aired on Nickelodeon on June 27, 1999.

Season 2 (1992)

References

External links

1991 American television series debuts
1992 American television series endings
1990s American sitcoms
American Broadcasting Company original programming
TGIF (TV programming block)
English-language television shows
Television series by CBS Studios
Television series about families
Television series about television
Television shows set in New Jersey
Television shows filmed in Florida
Nick at Nite original programming